The Beatles were an English rock band formed in Liverpool in 1960. With a lineup that consisted of John Lennon, Paul McCartney, George Harrison and Ringo Starr, the group has been regarded as the foremost and most influential music band in popular music history. The group received various awards and nominations during their career as a band, and has received more since their break-up.

Academy Awards
The Academy Awards, commonly known as the "Oscars", are a set of awards given by the Academy of Motion Picture Arts and Sciences annually for excellence of cinematic achievements.

!Ref.
|-
|1971
|Let It Be
|Best Music (Original Song Score)
|
|

American Music Awards
The American Music Awards have been awarded annually since 1973 and determined by a poll of music buyers. The Beatles have received one nomination, plus one special award determined by an Internet poll.

|Ref:
|-
| 1997
|Anthology 1
|Favorite Pop/Rock Album
|
|
|-

Awit Awards
The Awit Awards are music awards in the Philippines given annually by the Philippine Association of the Record Industry (PARI) to recognize the outstanding achievements in the music industry. The Beatles won one award.

|-
| 1969
|The Beatles
|Vocal Group of the Year - Foreign
|
|-

Billboard Music Awards

The Billboard Music Awards honor artists for commercial performance in the U.S., based on record charts published by Billboard. The awards are based on sales data by Nielsen SoundScan and radio information by Nielsen Broadcast Data Systems. The award ceremony was held from 1990 to 2007, until its reintroduction in 2011.

|-
| rowspan=3|2001
| 1
| Album of the Year
| 
|-
| rowspan=2|The Beatles
| Albums Artist of the Year
| 
|-
| Duo/Group Albums Artist of the Year
|

Brit Awards
The Brit Awards, originally known as the BPI Awards, were created by the British Phonographic Industry. The Beatles have received four awards. (The initial awards covered the 25-year period from 1952 to 1977. Since 1982, the awards have been an annual event.)

|-
|rowspan="4"|1977
|"She Loves You"
|British Single of the Year
|
|-
|Sgt. Pepper's Lonely Hearts Club Band
|British Album of the Year
|
|-
|rowspan="3"|The Beatles
|British Group
|
|-
|rowspan="2"|Outstanding Contribution to Music
|
|-
|1983
|
|-

Echo Music Prize
The Echo Music Prize, established in 1992, are held annually and are granted by the Deutsche Phono-Akademie. The Beatles have received two nominations.

|-
| style="text-align:center;"| 2001
| rowspan="2" | The Beatles
| rowspan="2" | Best International Group
| 
|-
| style="text-align:center;"| 2007
|
|-

Fryderyk
The Fryderyk is an annual award ceremony in Poland, presented by the Związek Producentów Audio Video, the IFPI Poland, since 1994. The Beatles have received one nomination.

!
|-
| style="text-align:center;"| 2006
| Love 
| Best Foreign Album
| 
|

Grammy Awards
The Grammy Awards are awarded annually by the National Academy of Recording Arts and Sciences in the United States. The Beatles have received seven competitive awards out of 23 nominations (excluding special awards or awards for individuals). Also, John Lennon and Paul McCartney won the Grammy Award for Song of the Year for "Michelle" in 1967, and all four members of the Beatles received an award for Let It Be for Best Original Score Written for A Motion Picture or A Television Special in 1971.  The Beatles were also credited as performers in the Grammy Award for Best Surround Sound Album for Love in 2008 won by the engineers and producers although the Beatles were ineligible for the awards.

 
!
|-
| rowspan="4" style="text-align:center;"| 1965
| "I Want to Hold Your Hand"
| Record of the Year
|
| rowspan="4" style="text-align:center;"|
|-
| rowspan="2"|"A Hard Day's Night"
| Best Contemporary Song
|
|-
| Best Performance by a Vocal Group
|
|-
| The Beatles
| Best New Artist
|
|-
| rowspan="3" style="text-align:center;"| 1966
| rowspan="2"|"Help!"
| Contemporary Rock & Roll Group Vocal Performance
|
| rowspan="4" style="text-align:center;"|
|-
| Vocal Group Performance
|
|-
| Help!
| Album of the Year
|
|-
| rowspan="2" style="text-align:center;"| 1967
| Revolver
| Album of the Year
|
|-
| "Michelle"
| Song of the Year
|
|style="text-align:center;"|
|-
| rowspan="5" style="text-align:center;"| 1968
| rowspan="4"|Sgt. Pepper's Lonely Hearts Club Band
| Album of the Year
|
| rowspan="5" style="text-align:center;"|
|-
| Best Contemporary Album
|
|-
| Group Vocal Performance
|
|-
| Contemporary Vocal Group
|
|-
|"A Day in the Life"
|Best Instrumental Arrangement Accompanying Vocalist(s)
|
|-
| rowspan="3" style="text-align:center;"| 1969
| Magical Mystery Tour
| Album of the Year
|
| rowspan="7" style="text-align:center;"|
|-
| rowspan="2"|"Hey Jude"
| Record of the Year
|
|-
| Best Pop Performance by a Duo or Group with Vocals
|
|-
| rowspan="2" style="text-align:center;"| 1970
| rowspan="2"|Abbey Road
| Album of the Year
|
|-
| Contemporary Vocal Group
|
|-
| rowspan="3" style="text-align:center;"| 1971
| "Let It Be"
| Record of the Year
|
|-
| rowspan="2"|Let It Be
| Contemporary Vocal Group
|
|-
| Best Original Score Written for a Motion Picture
|
| style="text-align:center;"|
|-
| style="text-align:center;"| 1996
| Live at the BBC
| Best Historical Album
|
| rowspan="4" style="text-align:center;"|
|-
| rowspan="3" style="text-align:center;"| 1997
| The Beatles Anthology
| Best Music Video, Long Form
|
|-
| rowspan="2"|"Free as a Bird"
| Best Music Video, Short Form
|
|-
| Best Pop Performance by a Duo or Group with Vocal
|
|-
| rowspan="2" style="text-align:center;"| 2008
| rowspan="2"|Love
| Best Compilation Soundtrack Album 
| 
|-
| Best Surround Sound Album
|
|-

Grammy Lifetime Achievement Award
The Grammy Lifetime Achievement Award is presented to those who, during their lifetimes, have made creative contributions of outstanding artistic significance to the field of recording. The Beatles won the award in 2014.

|-
| style="text-align:center;"| 2014
| The Beatles
| Lifetime Achievement Award
|
|-

Grammy Trustees Award
The Grammy Trustees Award is presented to individuals who, during their careers in music, have made significant contributions, other than performance, to the field of recording. The Beatles won the award in 1972.

|-
| style="text-align:center;"| 1972
| The Beatles
| Trustee Award
|
|-

Grammy Hall of Fame
The Grammy Hall of Fame was established by The Recording Academy's National Trustees in 1973 to honor recordings of lasting qualitative or historical significance that are at least 25 years old.

|-
|1993
|Sgt. Pepper's Lonely Hearts Club Band
|rowspan="2" |Inductee Album
|
|-
|1995
|Abbey Road
|
|-
|1997
|"Yesterday"
|rowspan="2" |Inductee Song
|
|-
|1998
|"I Want to Hold Your Hand"
|
|-
|rowspan="2" style="text-align:center;"|1999
|Revolver
|Inductee Album
|
|-
|"Strawberry Fields Forever"
|Inductee Song
|
|-
|rowspan="3" style="text-align:center;"|2000
|The Beatles
|rowspan="3" |Inductee Album
|
|-
|Rubber Soul
|
|-
|A Hard Day's Night
|
|-
|rowspan="2" style="text-align:center;"|2001
|"Hey Jude"
|rowspan="1" |Inductee Song
|
|-
|Meet the Beatles!
|Inductee Album
|
|-
|2002
|"Eleanor Rigby"
|rowspan="4" |Inductee Song
|
|-
|2004
|"Let It Be"
|
|-
|2008
|"Help!"
|
|-
|2011
|"Penny Lane"
|
|-

Ivor Novello Awards
The Ivor Novello Awards are presented annually in London by the British Academy of Songwriters, Composers and Authors (BASCA). The Beatles' songs were awarded fourteen times, while the group has received a Special Award.

|-
|rowspan="4" style="text-align:center;"|1964
|rowspan="2" |"She Loves You"
|The Most Broadcast Work of the Year
|
|-
|The ‘A’ Side of the Record Issued in 1963 Which Achieved the Highest Certified British Sales
|
|-
|"All My Loving"
|The Year's Outstanding Song
|
|-
|The Beatles
|Special Award for Outstanding Services to British Music
|
|-
|rowspan="5" style="text-align:center;"|1965
|"Can't Buy Me Love"
|rowspan="2" |The Most Performed Work of the Year
|
|-
|"A Hard Day's Night"
|
|-
|"Can't Buy Me Love"
|rowspan="2" |The ‘A’ Side of the Record Issued in 1964 Which Achieved the Highest Certified British Sales
|
|-
|"I Feel Fine"
|
|-
|"A Hard Day's Night"
|The Year's Outstanding Theme from Radio, TV or Film
|
|-
|rowspan="3" style="text-align:center;"|1966
|"We Can Work It Out"
|rowspan="2" |The ‘A’ Side of the Record Issued in 1965 Which Achieved the Highest Certified British Sales
|
|-
|"Help!"
|
|-
|"Yesterday"
|Outstanding Song of 1965
|
|-
|rowspan="3" style="text-align:center;"|1967
|"Michelle"
|rowspan="2" | The Most Performed Work of the Year
|
|-
|"Yesterday"
|
|-
|"Yellow Submarine"
|The ‘A’ Side of the Record Issued in 1966 Which Achieved the Highest Certified British Sales
|
|-
| style="text-align:center;"|1968
|"She's Leaving Home"
|Best British Song, Musically and Lyrically
|
|-
| style="text-align:center;"|1969
|"Hey Jude"
|The ‘A’ Side of the Record Issued in 1968 Which Achieved the Highest Certified British Sales
|
|-
|rowspan="2" style="text-align:center;"|1970
|"Get Back"
|The ‘A’ Side of the Record Issued in 1969 Which Achieved the Highest Certified British Sales
|
|-
|"Ob-La-Di Ob-La-Da"
|The Most Performed Work of the Year
|
|-
| style="text-align:center;"|1971
|"Something"
| Best Song Musically and Lyrically
|
|-

Japan Gold Disc Awards
The Recording Industry Association of Japan (RIAJ) presents the Japan Gold Disc Awards, honoring music sales in the country. The Beatles have received twelve awards.

|-
| style="text-align:center;"|1994
|The Beatles
|International Artist of the Year
|
|-
| style="text-align:center;"|1997
|Anthology Vol.1 & 2
|International Album of the Year
|
|-
| rowspan="2" style="text-align:center;"|2001
| The Beatles
|International Artist of the Year
|
|-
|1
|Best 4 Albums
|
|-
| rowspan="2" style="text-align:center;"|1994
|The Beatles
|International Artist of the Year
|
|-
|1962–1966
|Best International Rock Album
|
|-
| style="text-align:center;"| 2010
|rowspan="2"|The Beatles
|rowspan="2"|International Artist of the Year
|
|-
|rowspan="4" style="text-align:center;" |2016
|
|-
| rowspan="3" |1
|International Album of the Year
|
|-
|Best 3 Albums 
|
|-
|Best Music Video
|
|-

MOJO Awards
The MOJO Awards was a British award show given by music magazine Mojo.

|-
| style="text-align:center;"|2010
| The Beatles Remastered	
|Catalogue Release Of The Year	
|
|-

Meteor Music Awards

Launched in 2001, the Meteor Music Awards are awarded for achievements in the Irish and international record industry. The Beatles has received one award.

|-
| 2001
| 1
| Best Selling International Group Album 
|

MTV Video Music Awards 
The MTV Video Music Awards (VMAs) is an award show by the cable network MTV to honor the top music videos of the year. It was first held at the end of the summer of 1984, and originally was an alternative to the Grammy Award in the video category. The Beatles have received one award out of two nominations.

|-
| 1984
| The Beatles
| Video Vanguard Award
| 
|-
| 1996
| "Free as a Bird"
| Best Special Effects in a Video
|

NME Awards
The NME Awards is an annual British award show given by music magazine NME. The Beatles have won seventeen times.

|-
| rowspan="3" style="text-align:center;"|1963
| rowspan="2" |The Beatles
|World Vocal Group
|
|-
|British Vocal Group
|
|-
|"She Loves You"
|Best British Disc Of The Year
|
|-
| rowspan="2" style="text-align:center;"|1964
| rowspan="2" |The Beatles
|Outstanding Vocal Group
|
|-
|British Vocal Group
|
|-
| rowspan="2" style="text-align:center;"|1965
| rowspan="2" |The Beatles
|World Vocal Group
|
|-
|British Vocal Group
|
|-
| rowspan="2" style="text-align:center;"|1966
|"Eleanor Rigby"
|Best British Disc This Year
|
|-
|The Beatles
|British Vocal Group
|
|-
| rowspan="3" style="text-align:center;"|1968
| rowspan="2" |The Beatles
|World Vocal Group
|
|-
|British Vocal Group
|
|-
|"Hey Jude"
|Best British Disc Of The Year
|
|-
| rowspan="2" style="text-align:center;"|1970
|Let It Be
|1970s Best British LP
|
|-
|The Beatles
|Top British Group
|
|-
| rowspan="2" style="text-align:center;"|1971
|Let It Be
|1970s Best British LP
|
|-
|rowspan="2" |The Beatles
|Top British Group
|
|-
|2000
|Best Band Ever
|
|-

Q Awards
The Q Awards are a British annual awards held by music magazine Q, established in 1990. The Beatles have won one time.

|-
| style="text-align:center;"|1996
| Anthology 1	
|Best Reissue/Compilation	
|
|-

Rock and Roll Hall of Fame
The Rock and Roll Hall of Fame, established in 1983 and located in Cleveland, Ohio, United States, is dedicated to recording the history of some of the best-known and most influential musicians, bands, producers, and others that have in some major way influenced the music industry, particularly in the area of rock and roll. The Beatles were inducted in 1988. Lennon, McCartney, Harrison and Starr have all been inducted individually.
 
|-
| 1988
| The Beatles
|Honored Artist
|
|-

UK Music Hall of Fame
The UK Music Hall of Fame was an awards ceremony to honour musicians for their lifetime contributions to music in the United Kingdom. The first ceremony inducted five founder members selected by committee of music experts, one for every decade since the 1950s. The Beatles were awarded for the 1960s.

|-
| 2004
| The Beatles
|Founding member
|
|-

Vocal Group Hall of Fame
The Vocal Group Hall Of Fame was founded in 1997 to honor the greatest vocal groups of all time who have achieved worldwide recognition by way of their recordings, television appearances and other entertainment media. The Beatles were inducted in 2004.

|-
| 2004
| The Beatles
|Honored Artist
|
|-

World Music Awards
The World Music Awards, established in 1989, are held annually and honour worldwide sales figures. The Beatles have received two competitive awards and the Diamond Award, given to recording artists who have sold over 100 million albums throughout their career.

|-
| rowspan="2" style="text-align:center;"| 2001
| rowspan="2" |The Beatles
|World's Best Selling Pop Rock Artists/Group
|
|-
|World's Best Selling British Artist
|
|-
|2008
|The Beatles
|Chopard Diamond award
|
|-

See also
List of awards and nominations received by Paul McCartney
List of awards and nominations received by George Harrison

References

Awards
Lists of awards received by British musician
Lists of awards received by musical group